Cyrtopogon falto is a species of robber flies in the family Asilidae.

References

Asilidae
Articles created by Qbugbot
Insects described in 1849